The EXPO Garden Center is a station on Line 5 of Chongqing Rail Transit in Chongqing Municipality, China. It is located in Yubei District and opened in 2017.

Station structure

References

Yubei District
Railway stations in Chongqing
Chongqing Rail Transit stations